New Lothrop is a village in Shiawassee County in the U.S. state of Michigan. The population was 581 at the 2010 census. The village is located within Hazelton Township.

Geography

Demographics

2010 census
As of the census of 2010, there were 581 people, 232 households, and 163 families living in the village. The racial makeup of the village was 95.4% White, 0.2% African American, 0.2% Native American, 1.5% Asian, 1.0% from other races, and 1.7% from two or more races. Hispanic or Latino of any race were 2.8% of the population.

There were 232 households, of which 31.9% had children under the age of 18 living with them, 56.5% were married couples living together, 11.6% had a female householder with no husband present, 2.2% had a male householder with no wife present, and 29.7% were non-families. 25.9% of all households were made up of individuals, and 9.5% had someone living alone who was 65 years of age or older. The average household size was 2.50 and the average family size was 3.02.

The median age in the village was 40.4 years. 22.9% of residents were under the age of 18; 8.9% were between the ages of 18 and 24; 25.5% were from 25 to 44; 27.2% were from 45 to 64; and 15.5% were 65 years of age or older. The gender makeup of the village was 47.8% male and 52.2% female.

2000 census
As of the census of 2000, there were 603 people, 232 households, and 166 families living in the village. The racial makeup of the village was 96.68% White, 1.82% Native American, 0.17% from other races, and 1.33% from two or more races. Hispanic or Latino of any race were 0.33% of the population.

There were 232 households, out of which 38.8% had children under the age of 18 living with them, 59.5% were married couples living together, 11.2% had a female householder with no husband present, and 28.4% were non-families. 25.4% of all households were made up of individuals, and 7.8% had someone living alone who was 65 years of age or older.  The average household size was 2.60 and the average family size was 3.12.

In the village, the population was spread out, with 28.7% under the age of 18, 7.8% from 18 to 24, 28.9% from 25 to 44, 24.4% from 45 to 64, and 10.3% who were 65 years of age or older.  The median age was 35 years. For every 100 females, there were 93.3 males.  For every 100 females age 18 and over, there were 90.3 males.

The median income for a household in the village was $40,227, and the median income for a family was $46,875. Males had a median income of $42,292 versus $20,000 for females. The per capita income for the village was $21,056.  About 7.4% of families and 10.0% of the population were below the poverty line, including 11.8% of those under age 18 and 3.2% of those age 65 or over.

References

Villages in Shiawassee County, Michigan
Villages in Michigan
Populated places established in 1947
1947 establishments in Michigan